Mikel Cristoph Schreuders (born 21 September 1998) is an Aruban swimmer. He placed 45th in the 200 metre freestyle event at the 2016 Summer Olympics. He competed at the 2020 Summer Olympics.

College career 

Schreuders competed for the University of Missouri. He won the 2018 SEC title in the 200-yard freestyle. He finished eighth at the 2018 NCAA Championships in the same event.

References

External links

1998 births
Living people
People from Oranjestad, Aruba
Aruban male freestyle swimmers
Olympic swimmers of Aruba
Swimmers at the 2016 Summer Olympics
Swimmers at the 2020 Summer Olympics
Competitors at the 2018 Central American and Caribbean Games
Central American and Caribbean Games silver medalists for Aruba
Central American and Caribbean Games bronze medalists for Aruba
Swimmers at the 2019 Pan American Games
Central American and Caribbean Games medalists in swimming
Pan American Games competitors for Aruba
Competitors at the 2022 South American Games